Buka Rural LLG is a local-level government (LLG) of comprising Buka Island in the Autonomous Region of Bougainville, Papua New Guinea. Several Northwest Solomonic languages are spoken in the LLG.

Wards
02. Tsitalato
03. Hagogohe
04. Peit
05. Halia
06. Haku
07. Tonsu
80. Buka Urban

See also

Buka, Papua New Guinea
Buka Airport
Buka Island
Buka Island mosaic-tailed rat
Buka Island solomys
Buka Passage
Invasion of Buka and Bougainville
Hahalis Welfare Society
Kilu Cave
North Bougainville District
Our Lady of the Assumption Cathedral, Buka

References

Local-level governments of the Autonomous Region of Bougainville
Buka, Papua New Guinea